Cathedral of San Fernando or San Fernando Cathedral may refer to:

 Basilca Cathedral of San Fernando del Valle de Catamarca, Argentina
 Metropolitan Cathedral of San Fernando (Pampanga), Philippines
 Metropolitan Cathedral of San Fernando (Resistencia), Argentina
 Metropolitan Cathedral of San Fernando (San Antonio), Texas, United States
 San Fernando Cathedral (La Union), Philippines
 San Fernando Cathedral (Lucena), Philippines
 San Fernando Cathedral (Maldonado), Uruguay
 San Fernando de Apure Cathedral, Venezuela
 San Fernando Pro-Cathedral (Trinidad), Trinidad and Tobago

See also
 Ferdinand III of Castile or San Fernando